Randhir Sud, an Indian gastroenterologist and the Chairman of the Medanta Institute of Digestive and Hepatobiliary Sciences, is known to be one of the pioneers of Gastro Intestinal oncology in India. He is a former co-chairman of the department of gastroenterology at Sir Ganga Ram Hospital, New Delhi.

Sud graduated in medicine (MBBS) from the Government Medical College, Amritsar in 1977 and started his career as a junior resident doctor at the All India Institute of Medical Sciences, Delhi in 1979. While working, he continued his studies at AIIMS to secure an MD in 1981 and followed it up with a DM in gastroenterology in 1983. He worked at AIIMS till 1985 and moved to Sir Ganga Ram Hospital, Delhi, where he worked for 25 years till his move to Medanta in 2010. In between, he also served as a visiting professor at the Harvard Medical School, Boston in 1999, at the University of Texas Medical Branch (UTMB), Galveston, Texas and the University of Alabama, Birmingham. He is also an examiner for the Diplomate of National Board examinations in Gastroenterology of the National Board of Examinations. The Government of India awarded him the fourth highest civilian honour of the Padma Shri, in 2008, for his contributions to medicine.

References 

Recipients of the Padma Shri in medicine
Year of birth missing (living people)
All India Institute of Medical Sciences, New Delhi alumni
Academic staff of the All India Institute of Medical Sciences, New Delhi
Harvard Medical School faculty
University of Alabama at Birmingham faculty
University of Texas Medical Branch faculty
Indian medical academics
Indian gastroenterologists
Living people
20th-century Indian medical doctors